Fist City is the twelfth solo studio album by American country music singer-songwriter Loretta Lynn. It was released on April 15, 1968, by Decca Records.

Critical reception

In the issue dated May 4, 1968, Billboard magazine published a review of the album, saying, "Loretta Lynn couples potent lyrics with intense emotion on this LP. Call it county soul. "You Never Were Mine" is a tear jerker. An excellent LP."

The April 27, 1968 issue of Cashbox featured a review which said, "Highlighted by her No. 1 smash, "Fist City", Loretta Lynn's latest album is a powerhouse effort that's bound to be climbing the charts in short order. Lorett'’s warm, sincere singing has long made her the uncontested Queen of Country Music, and she seems only to get better with each successive disk." The review highlighted "Fist City", "A Satisfied Mind", "I Don’t Wanna Play House", and "What Kind of a Girl (Do You Think I Am?)" as the best songs on the album.

Commercial performance 
The album peaked at No. 1 on the US Billboard Hot Country LP's chart, becoming Lynn's second album to top the chart.

The first single, "What Kind of a Girl (Do You Think I Am)" was released in August 1967 and peaked at No. 5 on the US Billboard Hot Country Singles chart. The second single, "Fist City", was released in January 1968 and peaked at No. 1 on the chart, making it Lynn's second No. 1 hit.

Recording
Recording sessions for the album began on January 9, 1968, at Bradley's Barn in Mount Juliet, Tennessee. Two additional sessions followed on March 21 and March 22. "What Kind of a Girl (Do You Think I Am)" was recorded during the April 20, 1967 session for 1967's Singin' with Feelin'.

Track listing

Personnel
Adapted from the album liner notes and Decca recording session records.
Harold Bradley – electric bass guitar
Owen Bradley – producer
Hal Buksbaum – photography
Floyd Cramer – piano
Ray Edenton – guitar, acoustic guitar
Larry Estes – drums
Buddy Harman – drums
Junior Huskey – bass
The Jordanaires - background vocals
Loretta Lynn – lead vocals
Grady Martin – guitar, lead electric guitar
Harold Morrison – banjo
Hal Rugg – steel guitar
Pete Wade – guitar
Joe Zinkan – bass

Charts
Album

Singles

References 

1968 albums
Loretta Lynn albums
Albums produced by Owen Bradley
Decca Records albums